Centennial Conference football is an annual American football competition of the Centennial Conference competing in NCAA Division III.

History 

On June 4, 1981, the Centennial Conference was founded as a football-only league, then known as the Centennial Football Conference. Charter members included Dickinson College, Franklin & Marshall College, Gettysburg College, Johns Hopkins University, Muhlenberg College, Swarthmore College, Ursinus College, and Western Maryland College (now McDaniel College).

Standings by year

Championship records

By school

By year

References

 Centennial Conference Football Record Book (Archived)
 Centennial Conference Football History & Records (Archived)
Johns Hopkins Blue Jays football history and records book (Archived)
Muhlenberg football history
 Franklin & Marshall football
 Championship history
 Year-by-year results
 Stat archives
 McDaniel football schedule and results
 Dickinson football schedule and results
 Gettysburg football
 History
 Year-by-year records
 Ursinus football
 Archives
 schedule and results

External links
 Official website
D3Football.com Standings
ESPN Standings

Centennial Conference
Recurring sporting events established in 1983